The evacuation of Karafuto (Sakhalin) and the Kuriles refers to the events that took place during the Pacific theater of World War II as the Japanese population left these areas, to August 1945 in the northwest of the main islands of Japan.

The evacuation started under the threat of Soviet invasion. As Japanese civilians evacuated Korea and Manchuria, they cleared out of the Karafuto and Kurile Islands according to the terms of the Potsdam Declaration that the terms of the Cairo Declaration would be carried out, and Japanese sovereignty would be limited to the Home Islands of Honshū, Hokkaidō, Kyushu, Shikoku and such minor islands as the Allies determined.

Timeline

Karafuto

The operation began with the crossing of the Horonai (Poronai) Japanese frontier river post and bombardment of the Handenzawa Japanese land frontier post in Shikuka district, as well as the advance to the north of Koton (now Pobedino), a powerful fortified district (FD). Severe fighting with heavy losses on both sides continued for over a week, with Soviet troops breaking the Japanese defenses on 18 August. The Soviets also landed their naval forces deep behind enemy frontlines to aid their ground forces.

According to some of the 6,000 refugees already evacuated from the area, Soviet forces carried out fierce naval bombardment and artillery strikes against civilians awaiting evacuation as well as Japanese installations in Maoka, Shikuka on 10 August. Nearly 1,000 civilians were killed by machine-gun fire in this attack. Telephone operators in the city decided not to evacuate, instead maintaining contact with the Wakkanai and Mainland Japan until the moment that Soviet forces destroyed the telephone and postal installations in the city.

On 20 August, after Japan's surrender, fearing that they would be raped by the invading Soviet troops, nine of the twelve female operators poisoned themselves. Three were saved by male colleagues' intervention. The survivors at the post office were treated well by the Soviets.

On 16 August, the coastguard Zarnitsa, four minesweepers, two transports, six gunboats and nineteen torpedo boats landed in Port Toro (now Shakhtersk) with the 365th Separate Marine Battalion and one battalion of the 113th Infantry Brigade. The troops instantly engaged the Japanese in fierce battle and by morning of the next day had captured four populated areas and the port city of Esutoru (now Uglegorsk), Anbetsu (now Vozvrashcheniye) and Yerinai).

During the Soviet assault on Maoka, on 20 August, a combined marine battalion and the 113th Infantry Brigade landed in Port Maoka (now Kholmsk). They were preceded by a group of scouts, landed secretly by a submarine, in the Maoka area to successfully complete their task. However, Japanese resistance was desperate, and the landing party had to fight particularly fiercely. Japanese fire set one of the coastguard vessels on fire, to which the Soviet response was intense naval bombardment of the city, causing more civilian deaths.

The rest of the Japanese Maoka defenders retreated by Tei (now Polyakovo) and Futomato (now Chaplanovo) in Ikenohata county, between the mountains in the direction of Toyohara in order to make a last stand in the capital of the province or in Kawakami Sumiyama county for sustained guerrilla resistance.

On 25 August, another 1,600 men landed in Otomari (now Korsakov). The Japanese garrison of 3,400 men laid down their arms with almost no resistance and surrendered.

Some vessels of the last convoy, including civilian evacuees, had been sunk by Soviet submarines in the Aniva Gulf. Soviet Leninets-class submarine L-12 and L-19 sank two Japanese refugee transport ships Ogasawara Maru and Taito Maru also damaged No.2 Shinko Maru on 22 August. Over 2,400 civilian were killed.

Kuriles

The rout of Japanese forces in Manchuria and Sakhalin created favorable conditions for invasion of the Kurile Islands. The key Japanese position was on Shumushu and Paramushiro Islands. On 18 August, two coast guard ships, the mine layer Okhotsk, four minesweepers, 17 transports and 16 special landing vessels with nearly 9,000 sailors, soldiers, and officers on board, approached Shumushu and Paramushiro to start the landing operation. The Japanese offered fierce resistance. Bloody battles took place in Shumushu and Paramushiro with varying success till 23 August when the Japanese garrison surrendered.

By the end of August, all the northern Kuriles were under the control of Soviet forces, including Uruppu Island. The Northern Pacific Flotilla occupied the rest of the islands to the south of Uruppu. Up to 60,000 Japanese officers and men were taken prisoner in the Kuriles. The landing operation in the Kuriles was the last of World War II.

In the Kuriles a similar pattern was repeated when Japanese civilians desperately retired from Shumushu and Paramushiro before the Soviet invasion (the Russians only sank one war vessel transporting some Japanese troops), but did not occur at the time in some islands such as Uruppu and South Kuriles. In these cases, Russian troops arrived in aggressive form to expel local citizens and confiscate local property.

Fate of Western residents and Allied prisoners in the area
Similar treatment faced the German, Ukrainian and Polish citizens who resided in these provinces, the White Russians in the area (living from ancient Russian administration under the Shimoda agreement) were arrested, accused of high treason and collaboration with an enemy power. Some were sent to gulags in Kolyma, while others were summarily executed. Similar things happened to White Russians living in Manchukuo, Kwantung or North Chosen (Korea).

Some versions (including the work of American researchers) allege that Japanese forces during wartime sent certain Western POWs (Americans, British, Dutch, and the like) to detention camps in Karafuto and the Kuriles from other areas in Southeast Asia as well as to detention centers in Hokkaidō (Otaru POW center) and North Honshū, Manchukuo or Chōsen (the Japanese name for what later became North Korea).

The final fate of the supposed Allied POWs when Soviet forces arrived in these areas previously under Japanese administration, if unknown, is very similar to Americans captured or interned in Vladivostok (during the Doolittle Raid or B-29 strikes against Manchukuo industry) or Kamchatka (when Americans carried out some air strikes against North Kuriles Islands). Some reports also exist mentioning the possibility of identifying Americans interned in East Siberian gulags in the same period, and possibly into the Cold War period. Such a topic still awaits in-depth research by historians and experts of the area.

See also

 Battle of the Kuril Islands
 Japanese repatriation from Huludao
 Soviet assault on Maoka
 Soviet Invasion of South Sakhalin
 World War II evacuation and expulsion

References

External links
TASK FORCE RUSSIA -- BIWEEKLY REPORT 19 DECEMBER 1992-8 JANUARY 1993 12TH REPORT  TASK FORCE RUSSIA (POW/MIA)  REPORT TO THE U.S. DELEGATION, U.S.-RUSSIAN JOINT COMMISSION ON POW/MIAs  8 JANUARY 1993
History News Network

Karafuto
Kuril Islands
Japan in World War II
1945 in Japan
Karafuto and Kuriles
History of Sakhalin
Soviet World War II crimes
War crimes in Japan
Japan–Soviet Union relations